Kantoro Toktomamatov University of Economy and Enterprise is a university located in Jalal-Abad, Kyrgyzstan.

History 
The University of Economy and Enterprise was established in accordance with the decree of the President Askar Akayev dated  April 1, 1993, "On creation of the Commercial Institute in Jalal-Abad." According to this decree the university originally was called Jalalabad Commercial Institute. The rector that was appointed was professor Kantoro Sharipovich Toktomamatov, the brother of former president Sooronbay Jeenbekov.

On 16 July 2005, it was renamed as the Academy of Economy and Enterprise. In the same year, the decision of Ministry of Education of the Kyrgyz Republic on November 4, 2005, the university was given a new status. In accordance with the new status, the institute was renamed the University of Economy and Enterprise.
From the 2019 year university was renamed again and now is named International University named after K.SH.Toktomamatov.

Academics 
The University of Economy and Enterprise has the following faculties:

 Faculty of Economics and Administrative Sciences
 Department of Economy
 Department of Management
 Department of Public Administration
 Department of Finance and Banking
 Department of Accounting
 Department of Customs Affairs
 Department of Law
 Faculty of International Kyrgyz-Turkish Institute
 Faculty of Management
 Business Administration
 International relations
 Economy
 Tourism
 Faculty of Liberal Arts
 History
 Turkology

References

1993 establishments in Kyrgyzstan
Educational institutions established in 1993
Jalal-Abad Region
Universities in Kyrgyzstan